AMD Piledriver Family 15h is a microarchitecture developed by AMD as the second-generation successor to Bulldozer. It targets desktop, mobile and server markets. It is used for the AMD Accelerated Processing Unit (formerly Fusion), AMD FX, and the Opteron line of processors.

The changes over Bulldozer are incremental. Piledriver uses the same "module" design. Its main improvements are to branch prediction and FPU/integer scheduling, along with a switch to hard-edge flip-flops to improve power consumption. This resulted in clock speed gains of 8–10% and a performance increase of around 15% with similar power characteristics. FX-9590 is around 40% faster than Bulldozer-based FX-8150, mostly because of higher clock speed.

Products based on Piledriver were first released on 15 May 2012 with the AMD Accelerated Processing Unit (APU), code-named Trinity, series of mobile products. APUs aimed at desktops followed in early October 2012 with Piledriver-based FX-series CPUs released later in the month. Opteron server processors based upon Piledriver were announced in early December 2012.

Design 
Piledriver includes improvements over the original Bulldozer microarchitecture:
 Clustered Multi-Thread
 Higher clock rates
 Instructions per clock (IPC) improvements
 Lower power consumption and temperatures
 Turbo Core 3.0
 Faster integrated memory controller (IMC)
 Fixed hardware divider
 Improved branch prediction and prefetching
 Perceptron branch predictor
 Improved floating-point and integer scheduling
 Support for Advanced Vector Extensions (AVX) 1.1, FMA3, BMI1 and TBM
 Larger L1 translation lookaside buffers (TLB) and L2 efficiency improvements
 Switch to hard-edge flip-flops, allowing a decrease in power consumption
 Cyclos resonant clock mesh (RCM) technology
 17–220 W thermal design power (TDP)

Features

CPUs

APUs
APU features table

Processors

Desktop 

The K suffix denotes an unlocked A-series processor. All FX-series processors are unlocked unless otherwise specified.

Mobile

Server 
Some Opteron 32 nm processors.

History

Komodo platform 
Leaked roadmaps showed Piledriver CPUs featuring up to ten cores as part of the Komodo platform. Komodo was to launch in 2012 on the FM2 socket, but this never happened. AMD kept the AM3+ socket for the FX series and put the Piledriver-based APUs on FM2.

FX-series, Athlon and Opteron 
In 2010 AMD revealed that the 2nd generation was scheduled for 2012; AMD referred to this generation as Enhanced Bulldozer. This later generation of Bulldozer core was codenamed Piledriver.
 Vishera FX-series CPU – Desktop Performance market (Volan platform): This FX-series aimed at 95–220 W TDP features 4, 6 and 8 Piledriver core CPU models; with Turbo Core 3.0 while using the existing Socket AM3+ format and 900 series motherboard chipsets of the 1st generation FX-series Zambezi processor. The 2nd generation FX-series was released on 23 October 2012 with the FX-8350, FX-8320, FX-6300 and FX-4300 CPU models. The FX-8350 featured slightly improved power consumption and was found to be approximately 15% more powerful than the fastest Bulldozer CPU. The 2nd generation FX-series was praised for its affordability. The FX 8320 was recognized as a price/performance winner, often matching Intel's i7 2600 at half the cost. The Vishera CPUs competed well when compared to similarly priced Intel Ivy Bridge CPUs in multi-core-aware applications and somewhat underperform in overall efficiency and in tasks where most CPU cores were not fully utilized such as single-threaded applications and a number of games.

On June 11, 2013, AMD announced two additional FX-series eight Piledriver core CPUs, the FX-9590 and FX-9370, running at a maximum turbo speed of 5.0 GHz and 4.7 GHz respectively, making AMD the first company to ever release a 5 GHz CPU commercially. AMD specify that the 9xxx series processors require "robust liquid cooling" due to their high Thermal Design Power (TDP)
 Trinity & Richland Athlon series CPU – Desktop Budget market: Socket FM2 Athlon X4 730, 740, 750K and 760k CPU models feature the four Piledriver core Trinity microarchitecture but lack on-chip integrated graphics. Athlon X2 340 is dual core model. Socket FM2 Richland based Athlon X4 760K and Athlon X2 370K CPUs, both with no GPU and four and dual cores respectively were expected.

For the server market, three versions were stated to be under development:
 Web serving, Web hosting, and Microserver platform (1 CPU) market: Opteron 3200-series (Zurich; 4 or 8 cores) was to be replaced by Delhi (4 or 8 cores) using the Socket AM3+ format from the Desktop FX-series line. The memory controller was to support dual-channel DDR3 memory configuration.
 Cost/energy efficient server (1 to 2 CPUs) market: Opteron 4200-series (Valencia; 6 or 8 cores) was to be replaced by Seoul (6 or 8 cores). Seoul would continue to use the Socket C32 format. The memory controller would support dual-channel DDR3 memory configuration.
 Enterprise/mainstream server (2 to 4 CPUs) market: Opteron 6200-series (Interlagos; 4, 8, 12, and 16 cores) was to be replaced by Abu Dhabi (4, 8, 12, and 16 cores)). Abu Dhabi will continue to use the Socket G34. The memory controller would support quad-channel DDR3 memory configuration.

APU lines
 Trinity A-series APU – Desktop Budget and Mainstream market (Virgo platform): The Stars-based Llano Socket FM1 APU line replacements are the 2 and 4 Piledriver core Socket FM2 Trinity Fusion APUs. The A10-5800K, A10-5700, A8-5600K, A8-5500, A6-5400K and A4-5300 APU models were released on 2 October 2012. Trinity processor model numbers ending with the letter "K" denote processors with an unlocked CPU multiplier. The Trinity APU line was praised for its superior integrated graphics performance but underperformed comparable Intel CPU models in most computationally intensive tasks.
 Trinity A-series APU – Notebook Mainstream and Performance market (Comal platform): Notebook computers featuring Trinity APUs shipped as early as June 2012. The mobile Trinity series features four APUs: A10-4600M, A8-4500M, A6-4400M and A4-4300M. In March 2013, AMD announced two more mobile models: A8-4557M and A10-4657M.

In January 2013, AMD officially introduced a new series of APUs codenamed Richland. The series features six new APUs in total. The fastest model, the A10-6800K, featured two Piledriver modules operating at 4.1 GHz and 4.4 GHz in turbo mode and an integrated HD 8670D GPU with 384 stream processors operating at 844 MHz. Only the A10-6800K has official DDR3-2133 memory support. The A10-6800K offered approximately 5% performance improvements in performance applications and 3D games over its A10-5800K Trinity based predecessor, largely due to Richland's higher clock speeds and higher overclocking potential than Trinity. On March 12, 2013, AMD officially introduced four Richland mobile APUs. On June 4, 2013, AMD officially announced six Richland desktop APUs.

Performance 
In January 2012, Microsoft released two hotfixes (2646060 and 2645594) for Windows 7 and Server 2008 R2 that significantly improved the performance of Clustered Multi-Thread based AMD CPUs by improving thread scheduling.

Windows 8 supports CMT-based CPUs out of the box by addressing each core as logical cores and modules as physical cores.

See also 
 Steamroller (microarchitecture)
 List of AMD CPU microarchitectures
 AMD Accelerated Processing Unit
 List of AMD accelerated processing unit microprocessors
 List of AMD FX microprocessors
 Opteron

References 

AMD x86 microprocessors
AMD microarchitectures
X86 microarchitectures